Wayne Remington Rice (July 26, 1885June 7, 1945) was a Michigan politician.

Early life 
Rice was born on a farm in Plainfield Township, Kent County, Michigan on July 26, 1885 to parents Nathaniel and Adelia Rice. Rice was of Irish ancestry.

Career 
Rice practiced law in White Cloud, Newaygo County. Rice served as Newaygo County Circuit Court Commissioner in 1910. Rice was first sworn in as a Member of the Michigan House of Representatives from the Newaygo County district on January 1, 1913. In 1917, continued to serve in that capacity, while also becoming Speaker Pro Tempore Michigan House of Representatives until 1916. In his final term served on the Michigan House of Representatives, Rice was the Speaker of the Michigan House of Representatives.

Death 
Rice died on June 7, 1945. Rice is interred at the Greenwood Cemetery in Grand Rapids, Kent County, Michigan.

References 

1885 births
1945 deaths
Speakers of the Michigan House of Representatives
Republican Party members of the Michigan House of Representatives
University of Michigan alumni
Burials in Michigan
20th-century American lawyers
20th-century American politicians